Wolkenstein is a German language surname. Notable people with the name include:
 Julie Wolkenstein (1968), French writer
 Lev Philippovitch Wolkenstein (1858–1935), Russian jurist, lawyer and cade
 Oswald von Wolkenstein (1377–1445), German poet, composer and diplomat

References 

German-language surnames